WJNI may refer to:

 WJNI (FM), a radio station (106.3 FM) licensed to Ladson, South Carolina, United States
 WJNI-LD, a low-power television station (channel 31) licensed to North Charleston, South Carolina, United States